Casa Rossell  is a manor house located in Ordino, Andorra. It is a heritage property registered in the Cultural Heritage of Andorra.

References

Ordino
Houses in Andorra
Cultural Heritage of Andorra